The NeuroDiagnostic Institute (NDI) is a state psychiatric hospital located in Indianapolis, Indiana. The hospital serves Central Indiana, having replaced the now-closed Larue D. Carter Memorial Hospital. NDI is operated by the State of Indiana Family and Social Services Administration in partnership with the private Community Health Network. The hospital, built on the Community Hospital East campus, opened on March 15, 2019 as Indiana's first new state psychiatric hospital in decades.

History
NDI was announced in 2015 as the successor to the State's aging Larue D. Carter Memorial Hospital. Compared to Larue, NDI has a larger staff (500 versus 350), more beds for pediatric patients (65 versus 42), and significantly more security cameras. Completed at a cost of $118 million, NDI is designed to serve 1,500 patients annually for acute and chronic mental illness, chronic addictions, adolescent autism spectrum disorders, traumatic brain injuries, and neuro-degenerative illnesses such as Alzheimer’s disease.

See also
List of hospitals in Indianapolis

References

Psychiatric hospitals in Indiana
Healthcare in Indianapolis
Hospitals established in 2019
Hospital buildings completed in 2019